The Union of Democrats and Independents (UDI) is a centre to centre-right political party in France and former electoral alliance founded on 18 September 2012 on the basis of the parliamentary group of the same name in the National Assembly. The party was composed of separate political parties who retained their independence, but always in coalition with the biggest right wing party The Republicans. As most of them have been expelled or have left, the Democratic European Force is the last founding party to participate in the UDI.

The party's current president is Jean-Christophe Lagarde, who was elected at the congress of the party on 15 November 2014, after the resignation of Jean-Louis Borloo on 6 April 2014 for health reasons.

History
On 9 October 2012, the leaderships of the parties making up the UDI parliamentary group announced the creation of a new political party and set up a temporary office in Paris. On 21 October, a founding assembly was convened at the Maison de la Mutualité in Paris, which marked the official foundation of the movement.

Following the congress of the Union for a Popular Movement (UMP) on 18 November 2012 and the ensuing tensions between the two rival candidates for the party's presidency, a number of leading figures of the UMP announced that they were joining the UDI, including former cabinet minister and deputy Pierre Méhaignerie and Mayenne deputy Yannick Favennec. However, during a legislative by-election on 9 and 16 December 2012 in the Val-de-Marne's 1st constituency, UDI incumbent Henri Plagnol - a former member of the UMP who had joined the UDI in June - was defeated by a right-wing dissident, Sylvain Berrios.

On 9 June 2013, the UDI gained a deputy (Meyer Habib) at the by-election in the Eighth constituency for French residents overseas, but this contribution was cancelled out by Gilles Bourdouleix's resignation from UDI after the controversy for saying Adolf Hitler had not killed enough Romani people.

The UDI became a member of the Alliance of Liberals and Democrats for Europe Party on 2 December 2016.

Although the UDI leadership supported François Fillon in the 2017 French presidential election, several members of the party were supporting En Marche! candidate Emmanuel Macron.

Former members
The National Centre of Independents and Peasants was expelled after its leader and only deputy Gilles Bourdouleix's resigned for saying Adolf Hitler had not killed enough Romani people. The Centrist Alliance was excluded on 25 March 2017 as a result of its support for Emmanuel Macron; Territories in Movement left after the results of the 2015 regional elections; and the Liberal Democratic Party (PLD) was excluded from the UDI in December 2013. The Radical Party left after its reunification with the Radical Party of the Left to form the Radical Movement on 10 December 2017 (and therefore the Modern Left as well); on 16 December, The Centrists followed suit in announcing its intention to quit the UDI. The Democratic European Force is the last founding party to remain a component of the UDI.

Election results

Legislative elections

European elections 
The 2014 elections involved an alliance with the forces of the Democratic Movement (MoDem); this joint list, The Alternative (L'Alternative), saw 3 UDI MEPs out of 7 elected from the list. The change in seats shown is since the 2009 election for the MoDem list.

See also
The Constructives: Republicans, UDI, and Independents group
Centrist Union group

References

External links
Official website

2012 establishments in France
Political parties established in 2012
Political parties of the French Fifth Republic
Liberal parties in France
Centrist parties in France
Christian democratic parties in Europe
Pro-European political parties in France